Irié Bi Séhi Elysée (born 13 September 1989), commonly known as Elysée, is an Ivorian professional footballer who plays as a defensive midfielder for Meistriliiga club JK Narva Trans.

Career

Club

Mordovia Saransk
Elysée made his debut for Mordovia Saransk on 30 March 2010, as a substitute against Irtysh.

JK Narva Trans
Elysée's debut for JK Narva Trans came on 8 May 2012, in the 2–1 Estonian Cup win against Paide. He made his league debut later on 2 June 2012 against JK Tammeka Tartu, where he also scored his first goal for the club in a 2–0 win.

International career
Elysée played for the Ivory Coast national football team at the 2009 African Championship of Nations.

Career statistics

Club

References

External links
 Profile at FC Mordovia Saransk website
 Statistics at stats.sportbox.ru

Ivorian footballers
Ivorian expatriate footballers
Footballers from Abidjan
Ivory Coast international footballers
Expatriate footballers in Russia
1989 births
Living people
ES Bingerville players
FC Mordovia Saransk players
Meistriliiga players
JK Narva Trans players
Expatriate footballers in Estonia
Association football midfielders
2009 African Nations Championship players
Ivory Coast A' international footballers
Ivorian expatriate sportspeople in Russia
Ivorian expatriate sportspeople in Estonia